is a Japanese footballer currently playing as a goalkeeper for YSCC Yokohama, on loan from Urawa Reds.

Career statistics

Club
.

Notes

References

External links

2000 births
Living people
Association football people from Gunma Prefecture
Japanese footballers
Japan youth international footballers
Association football goalkeepers
J3 League players
Urawa Red Diamonds players
Renofa Yamaguchi FC players
YSCC Yokohama players